Dennis Patrick Riddell (born October 21, 1956) is a  Republican member of the North Carolina House of Representatives. He has represented the 64th district (including constituents in southern Alamance County) since 2013.

Committee assignments

2021-2022 Session
Appropriations (Vice Chair)
Appropriations - General Government (Chair)
Regulatory Reform (Chair)
Education - K-12 
Election Law and Campaign Finance Reform
Energy and Public Utilities 
Federal Relations and American Indian Affairs

2019-2020 Session
Appropriations (Vice Chair)
Appropriations - General Government (Chair)
Regulatory Reform (Chair)
Education - K-12 
Election Law and Campaign Finance Reform
Energy and Public Utilities

2017-2018 Session
Appropriations (Vice Chair)
Appropriations - General Government (Chair)
Regulatory Reform (Chair)
Education - K-12
Elections and Ethics Law
Energy and Public Utilities
Agriculture
Ethics
Judiciary IV

2015-2016 Session
Appropriations (Vice Chair)
Appropriations - General Government (Chair)
Regulatory Reform (Chair)
Education - K-12
Elections
Public Utilities
Agriculture
Judiciary IV
Children, Youth and Families

2013-2014 Session
Appropriations
Education (Vice Chair)
Elections
Public Utilities
Agriculture
Commerce and Job Development

Electoral history

2020

2018

2016

2014

2012

References

Living people
1956 births
People from Snow Camp, North Carolina
California State University Maritime Academy alumni
Bob Jones University alumni
Republican Party members of the North Carolina House of Representatives
21st-century American politicians